The Bayer designation γ Octantis (Pi Octantis, π Oct) is shared by two stars in the constellation Octans. Both of them are evolved G-type stars that have similar apparent magnitudes.
π1 Octantis, HR 5525 or HD 130650
π2 Octantis, HR 5545 or HD 131246

Octantis, Pi
Octans